Cascos is a surname. Notable people with the surname include:

 Antonio Cascos (born 1963), Spanish cross-country skier
 Carlos Cascos (born 1952), Mexican-American accountant and 110th Secretary of State of Texas

See also
 Francisco Álvarez-Cascos (born 1947), Spanish politician
 Casco (disambiguation)